Pia Giancaro (born 12 March 1950) is an Italian former actress and television personality.

Life and career 
Born Maria Pia Gianporcaro in Palermo, the daughter of a Sicilian railroad worker and a Slavic mother, Giancaro in 1968 won the Miss Sicily beauty contest and entered the Miss Italy competition. One year later she made her television debut  alongside Corrado in the RAI quiz show A che gioco giochiamo?. Shorty later Giancaro started appearing in films,  mainly in character roles. Giancaro later married the prince Lillio Sforza Marescotti Ruspoli and retired from show business.

References

External links 
 

Italian film actresses
Italian television personalities
1950 births
Mass media people from Palermo
Living people
Actresses from Palermo
Models from Sicily